Pope Victor I (died 199) was the bishop of Rome in the late second century (189–199 A.D.). The dates of his tenure are uncertain, but one source states he became pope in 189 and gives the year of his death as 199. He was born in the Roman Province of Africa—probably in Leptis Magna (or Tripolitania). He was later considered a saint. His feast day was celebrated on 28 July as "St Victor I, Pope and Martyr".

Biography
The primary sources vary over the dates assigned to Victor's episcopate, but indicate it included the last decade of the second century. Eusebius puts his accession in the tenth year of Commodus (i.e. A.D. 189), which is accepted by Lipsius as the correct date. Jerome's version of the Chronicle puts his accession in the reign of Pertinax, or the first year of Septimius Severus (i.e. 193), while the Armenian version puts it in the seventh year of Commodus (186). The Liber Pontificalis dates his accession to the consulate of Commodus and Glabrio (i.e. 186), while the Liberian Catalogue, a surviving copy of the source the Liber Pontificalis drew upon for its chronology, is damaged at this point

Concerning the duration of his episcopate, Eusebius, in his Ecclesiastical History, does not state directly the duration of his episcopate, but the Armenian version of Eusebius' Chronicle gives it as 12 years. The Liberian Catalogue gives his episcopate a length of nine years two months and ten days, while the Liber Pontificalis states it was ten years and the same number of months and days; the Felician Catalogue something over ten. Finally, Eusebius in his History (5.28) states Zephyrinus succeeded him "about the ninth year of Severus", (201), while the Liber Pontificalis dates it to the consulate of Laternus and Rufinus (197). Lipsius, considering Victor in connection with his successors, concludes that he held office between nine and ten years, and therefore gives as his dates 189–198 or 199.

According to an anonymous writer quoted by Eusebius, Victor excommunicated Theodotus of Byzantium for teaching that Christ was a mere man. However, he is best known for his role in the Quartodeciman controversy. Prior to his elevation, a difference in dating the celebration of the Christian Passover/Easter between Rome and the bishops of Asia Minor had been tolerated by both the Roman and Eastern churches.

The churches in Asia Minor celebrated Easter on the 14th of the Jewish month of Nisan, the day before Jewish Passover, regardless of what day of the week it fell on, as the Crucifixion had occurred on the Friday before Passover, justifying this as the custom they had learned from the apostles; for this the Latins called them Quartodecimans. Synods were held on the subject in various parts—in Judea under Theophilus of Caesarea and Narcissus of Jerusalem, in Pontus under Palmas, in Gaul under Irenaeus, in Corinth under its bishop, Bachillus, at Osrhoene in Mesopotamia, and elsewhere—all of which disapproved of this practice and consequently issued by synodical letters declaring that "on the Lord's Day only the mystery of the resurrection of the Lord from the dead was accomplished, and that on that day only we keep the close of the paschal fast" (Eusebius H. E. v. 23).

Despite this disapproval, the general feeling was that this divergent tradition was not sufficient grounds for excommunication. Victor alone was intolerant of this difference, and severed ties with these ancient churches, whose bishops included Polycrates of Ephesus; in response he was rebuked by Irenaeus and others, according to Eusebius.

Quartodeciman Controversy

During the reign of Victor I, bishop of Rome, a universal dispute arose amongst the Christians concerning the feast of the Passover. A synod was convened to discuss the issue, and those in attendance agreed that the paschal fast must end on a Sunday. In response to the ruling of the synod and the command issued by Victor I, the churches of the East, led by Polycrates, wrote a reply that is recorded by Eusebius the historian as such: "We observe the exact day; neither adding, nor taking away. For in Asia also great lights have fallen asleep, which shall rise again on the day of the Lord's coming, when he shall come with glory from heaven, and shall seek out all the saints. Among these are Philip, one of the twelve apostles, who fell asleep in Hierapolis; and his two aged virgin daughters, and another daughter, who lived in the Holy Spirit and now rests at Ephesus; and, moreover, John, who was both a witness and a teacher, who reclined upon the bosom of the Lord, and, being a priest, wore the sacerdotal plate. He fell asleep at Ephesus. And Polycarp in Smyrna, who was a bishop and martyr; and Thraseas, bishop and martyr from Eumenia, who fell asleep in Smyrna. Why need I mention the bishop and martyr Sagaris who fell asleep in Laodicea, or the blessed Papirius, or Melito, the Eunuch who lived altogether in the Holy Spirit, and who lies in Sardis, awaiting the episcopate from heaven, when he shall rise from the dead? All these observed the fourteenth day of the passover according to the Gospel, deviating in no respect, but following the rule of faith. And I also, Polycrates, the least of you all, do according to the tradition of my relatives, some of whom I have closely followed. For seven of my relatives were bishops; and I am the eighth. And my relatives always observed the day when the people put away the leaven. I, therefore, brethren, who have lived sixty-five years in the Lord, and have met with the brethren throughout the world, and have gone through every Holy Scripture, am not affrighted by terrifying words. For those greater than I have said 'We ought to obey God rather than man...I could mention the bishops who were present, whom I summoned at your desire; whose names, should I write them, would constitute a great multitude. And they, beholding my littleness, gave their consent to the letter, knowing that I did not bear my gray hairs in vain, but had always governed my life by the Lord Jesus."

These events and Victor's response to Polycrates' letter are recorded by Socrates Scholasticus as such: "In Asia Minor most people kept the fourteenth day of the moon, disregarding the sabbath: yet they never separated from those who did otherwise, until Victor, bishop of Rome, influenced by too ardent a zeal, fulminated a sentence of excommunication against the Quartodecimans in Asia." This led to a sharp rebuke by many prominent bishops (including the most well known, Irenaeus).

See also

List of Catholic saints
List of popes

References

Literature 
 
 
 Handl A. (2016). Viktor I. (189?-199?) von Rom und die Etablierung des “monarchischen” Episkopats in Rom. Sacris Erudiri: a Journal on the Inheritance of Early and Medieval Christianity, 55, 7-56.

External links 
 
 
 San Vittore I Papa e martire - 28 luglio
 
 Collected works of Migne Patrologia Latina
 
 Complete works by Migne Patrologia Latina

199 deaths
2nd-century archbishops
2nd-century Berber people
2nd-century Christian saints
2nd-century popes
2nd-century Romans
African popes
Berber Christians
Papal saints
Popes
Saints from Roman Africa (province)
Year of birth unknown
Burials at St. Peter's Basilica